Taegukgi: The Brotherhood of War (Taegukgi Hwinallimyeo) is a 2004 South Korean wartime action drama film directed by Kang Je-gyu. It stars Jang Dong-gun and Won Bin and tells the story of two brothers who are forcibly drafted into the South Korean army at the outbreak of the Korean War.

Kang Je-gyu made a name for himself directing Shiri and was able to attract top talent and capital to his new project, eventually spending 12.8 million USD on production. The film became one of the biggest successes in the South Korean film history up to that time, attracting 11.74 million people to the theatre, beating the previous record holder Silmido.

Plot 
In 2003, while digging up remains at a Korean War battlefield to set up a memorial site, a South Korean army excavation team notifies an elderly man that they identified some remains as his own even though he is still alive.

53 years earlier, in June 1950, the Lee family goes about their lives in the South Korean capital of Seoul. Lee Jin-tae owns a shoeshine stand to pay for his younger brother Jin-seok's education. Jin-tae has also bought them a silver pen, a precious item the brothers share, and is working on a pair of immaculate shoes for his brother to wear to school. Jin-tae's fiancée, Young-shin, works with the Lees' noodle shop. On June 25, 1950, North Korea invades South Korea, and both brothers are forcibly conscripted. They are assigned to the 1st Infantry Division, fighting at the Pusan Perimeter before advancing north upon the successful U.S. amphibious landing at Inchon. Jin-tae is told by a superior that if he can earn the highest award for a South Korean soldier, the Taeguk Cordon of the Order of Military Merit, his brother can be sent home. Jin-tae volunteers for many dangerous missions and performs suicidal acts of bravery to earn the medal, and is quickly promoted to sergeant. His heroism during the urban Battle of Pyongyang finally results in Jin-tae's nomination for the medal, but his combat experiences have made him into an emotionless killer, which horrifies his younger brother.

The UN coalition is eventually forced to retreat all the way back to Seoul when the Chinese enter the war on the North Korean side. Jin-tae finally earns his medal, but in Seoul, Young-shin, suspected of joining the Communist Party during the Communist occupation, is arrested by a South Korean militia, and the brothers attempt to stop them. During the struggle, Young-shin is shot dead, and the brothers are arrested for trying to rescue her. In jail Jin-tae's request to release his brother is refused, and the security commander orders the prison set afire with the prisoners inside when the enemy forces approach. Trying to rescue his brother, Jin-tae loses consciousness and wakes up believing Jin-seok died in the fire. He murders the surrendering prison warden before being captured by Chinese soldiers.

In truth, however, Jin-seok had been transferred to a military hospital after barely escaping, rescued by "Uncle Yang", a now-disabled veteran from their old unit. Jin-seok learns that his brother had defected to the North Koreans and now leads an elite North Korean formation known as the "Flag Unit".

Jin-seok chooses to rejoin the Army, which has by now retaken all of what is today South Korea with UN support. He demands to be allowed to fight, at the 38th parallel, but is denied. Jin-seok eventually defects, claiming to his captors he is Jin-tae's brother. The North Koreans, however, believe Jin-seok is a spy and are about to take him away for interrogation when their position is attacked by U.S. and South Korean forces. The attack frees Jin-seok, who continues his search as the position is captured in a vicious hand-to-hand battle. Before the U.S. and South Korean forces can secure their gains, however, the "Flag Unit" arrives, tearing into them with Jin-tae at its head.

The brothers come face-to-face, but, not recognizing Jin-seok, Jin-tae attempts to kill him, and Jin-seok barely avoids death before his brother is briefly incapacitated. Jin-seok attempts to carry him away but is shot in the leg. With both of them wounded, Jin-tae finally recognizes his younger brother, and the two have a tearful reunion. This is cut short, however, as the North Koreans force back the U.S. and South Korean troops. Jin-Tae orders his brother to save himself. Jin-seok initially refuses but relents after Jin-Tae promises that they will meet again. As the wounded Jin-seok limps to safety, Jin-tae mans a machine gun and provides cover fire for his younger brother and the other South Koreans before being killed.

In 2003, the elderly Jin-seok stands at the excavation site; the remains initially identified as his are those of Jin-tae. He examines Jin-tae's few excavated belongings, including their long-lost silver pen, and begs his brother's skeletal remains to speak to him, quoting his promises as his granddaughter looks on with sympathy.

Back in the 1950s, in the aftermath of the Korean War, Jin-seok returns to his mother, who also survived, discovers the shoes to which his brother had dedicated himself to perfecting, and heads off with Young-shin's younger siblings in a now-peaceful, but ruined, Seoul as the nation begins rebuilding. He reassures them that he will return to school, fulfilling the promise he made to Jin-tae.

Cast 
 Jang Dong-gun as Lee Jin-tae
 Won Bin as Lee Jin-seok, Jin-tae's younger brother
 Jang Min-ho as old Lee Jin-seok
 Lee Eun-ju as Kim Young-shin, Jin-tae's fiancée
 Choi Min-sik as North Korean commander
 Gong Hyung-jin as Yong-man
 Ahn Gil-kang as Sergeant Heo
 Jeon Jae-hyeong as Yong-seok
 Jo Yoon-hee as Lee Jin-seok's granddaughter
 Kim Soo-ro as Anti-Communist Federation member
 Joo Da-young as Young-ja
 Kim Jae-joong as Corpse hazardous excavation site unit

Prior to Kim Jae-joong's debut as a singer, he worked as extra, one is a Corpse hazardous excavation site unit and the other is a Chinese soldier (uncredited).

Jo Sung-mo also worked as an extra, playing a soldier of the North Korean People's Army (uncredited).

Production

Title 
The film's title is the name of the pre-war flag of the People's Republic of Korea, the flag of the Provisional People's Committee for North Korea as well as the current flag of South Korea, featuring the Taegeuk symbol. It was released in the United Kingdom as Brotherhood: Taegukgi and the United States as Tae Guk Gi: The Brotherhood of War.

Soundtrack 

The music was composed by Lee Dong-june, and released on February 23, 2004 as a single CD, produced by Yejeon Media in South Korea and Avex Trax in Japan. It has 25 tracks, with seven bonus tracks, including a solo piano and chamber ensemble arrangement of the main theme. The "haunting" main theme's lyricism, present throughout several of the tracks, was compared favorably to music of film score composers Ennio Morricone and John Williams. Although it was received generally positively, one critic argued that the film was tragic enough already, and needed "a more subtle soundtrack."

Reception 
At the 50th Asia Pacific Film Festival, Taegukgi won the "Best Film" award, while Kang Je-gyu was awarded the "Best Director". It was one of four Korean movies screened at the 2006 International Fajr Film Festival in Iran. At the 2004 Grand Bell Awards, the main awards for film in South Korea, Taegukgi won three technical awards, for art direction, cinematography and sound effects.

According to the numbers at Box Office Mojo, Taegukgi earned ₩64.8 billion in South Korea, $1.1 million in the United States playing in limited release and $68.7 million overall worldwide, to finish as the 75th highest-grossing film in the world in 2004.

In addition to its record-breaking reception in South Korea, the film has also achieved positive responses abroad. Taegukgi holds a fresh rating of 80% at Rotten Tomatoes. Most positive reviews cite its unflinching portrayal of war and praise it for showing the brutality of both the North and South Korean armies. The film is also recommended by the War Nerd Gary Brecher.

Awards and nominations

See also 
 List of historical drama films of Asia
 Goyang Geumjeong Cave massacre
 Namyangju Massacre

Notes

References

External links 
 
 
 
 
 
 
 Review at koreanfilm.org

2004 films
2000s action drama films
2000s action war films
South Korean action drama films
South Korean war drama films
Korean War films
2000s Korean-language films
Films about brothers
Films set in 1950
Films set in 1951
Films set in 1952
Films set in 1953
Films set in 2003
Films set in North Korea
Films set in Pyongyang
Films set in South Korea
Films set in Daegu
Films set in Daejeon
Films set in Seoul
Films shot in Seoul
Films directed by Kang Je-gyu
Showbox films
2004 drama films
Films about the Republic of Korea Armed Forces
2000s South Korean films